Issam Jellali (born 22 March 1981) is a Tunisian tennis coach and a former player. Currently, he coaches compatriot Ons Jabeur.

Futures and Challenger finals

Singles: 0

Doubles: 1–0

References

External links 
 

1981 births
Tennis coaches
Living people
Tunisian male tennis players
Tunisian tennis coaches
21st-century Tunisian people